Sainte-Hélène-de-Bagot is a municipality in southwestern Quebec, Canada in the Regional County Municipality of Les Maskoutains. The population as of the Canada 2011 Census was 1,637.

History 
This municipality was born from the merger, in 1977, of the parish municipality of Sainte-Hélène, founded in 1855, and the village municipality of Sainte-Hélène-de-Bagot, founded in 1925.

Geography 
Sainte-Hélène-de-Bagot is located between Saint-Hyacinthe and Drummondville and is crossed by the Highway 20 - Jean-Lesage, the village on one side and the land on the other.

Its location allowed, in the 1970s, with the construction of a highway between Montreal and Quebec, to become a stopover village. Several restaurants and service stations are present in this locality of 1500 inhabitants. According to the Ministry of Transport of Quebec, more than 1000 trucks a day stop in this small village.

The municipality was once part of County of Bagot. It is now part of the provincial riding of Johnson.

Demographics

Population

Language

See also
List of municipalities in Quebec

References

Municipalities in Quebec
Incorporated places in Les Maskoutains Regional County Municipality